The Victoria is a Grade II listed public house at 10a Strathearn Place in Bayswater, London W2 2NH. It is on the Campaign for Real Ale's National Inventory of Historic Pub Interiors.

The pub was built circa 1840–50, and has four above ground storeys, with bars on ground and first floors, plus a dining room on the first floor. It has a rounded frontage on an acutely angled corner site between Strathearn Place and Sussex Place, extended by two bays to the former and one to the latter side. The pub's ground-floor interior was remodelled circa 1897-8, although it does include some remnants of the original interior. The first floor rooms, and especially the Theatre Bar, contain many interior elements from the Gaiety Theatre, installed in the pub circa 1958, after the theatre had been demolished.

The pub is owned and operated by Fuller, Smith & Turner, trading under the Fuller's brand.

Gallery

References

Pubs in the City of Westminster
Grade II listed pubs in the City of Westminster
National Inventory Pubs
Bayswater
Grade II listed buildings in the City of Westminster
Fuller's pubs